Kinclaith distillery was the last Malt whisky still built in Glasgow, within the Strathclyde Grain distillery complex, in 1958. The Kinclaith distillery was closed in 1975.

Production 
The Kinclaith was a lowland malt Scotch whisky, produced from the waters of Loch Katrine.

Following the closure of the still, the stock, casked and bottled, has become rare, making it more collectable and the value has increased substantially. Today it is one of the most expensive brands in the world with bottles fetching prices of between $1500 and $4000 each.

Value increases

References 

Scottish malt whisky